Gonnelien Rothenberger (born 5 June 1969 in Weert, Limburg) is an equestrian from the Netherlands, who was born as Gonneke Antoinette Arnolda Johanna Adriana Robertine Gordijn. She is married to German equestrian Sven Rothenberger, with whom she won the silver medal in the Team Dressage Event at the 1996 Summer Olympics in Atlanta, Georgia for Holland, alongside Anky van Grunsven and Tineke Bartels. In the Individual Competition she finished in sixteenth position.

References 

1968 births
Living people
Dutch dressage riders
Equestrians at the 1996 Summer Olympics
Olympic equestrians of the Netherlands
Dutch female equestrians
Olympic medalists in equestrian
Olympic silver medalists for the Netherlands
Sportspeople from Weert
Medalists at the 1996 Summer Olympics